The World Rally Championship for Manufacturers (or WRC Manufacturers' Championship) is a title awarded by the FIA to the most successful manufacturer over a World Rally Championship season, as determined by a points system based on rally results. The WRC was formed from well-known and popular international rallies, most of which had previously been part of the European Rally Championship and/or the International Championship for Manufacturers; the series was first contested in 1973. The first official rallying Manufacturers' Champion was Alpine-Renault. On seventeen occasions the Manufacturers' Champion team has not contained the World Drivers' Champion for a given season.

In the 45 seasons the Championship has been awarded, only 13 different manufacturers have won it; Lancia being the most successful, with 10 titles including 6 consecutive from 1987 to 1992. Only seven countries have produced winning manufacturers: France (3), Japan (3), Italy (2), the United Kingdom (2), Germany (2), South Korea (1), and United States (1).

Key

By season
Manufacturers who also facilitated the WRC Drivers' champion in the same season are shown in bold.

By manufacturer

By nationality

See also
List of World Rally Championship Drivers' champions
List of World Rally Championship Co-Drivers' champions
List of World Rally Championship records

Notes

References

General:
WRC History
RallyBase.nl
eWRC-results.com
juwra.com – Jonkka's World Rally Archive

External links
 World Rally Championship official site
 FIA official site

Constructors' champions
rally
Rally